Football Club Meyrin is a football team based in Meyrin in Switzerland. They currently play in the 1. Liga, the third tier of the Swiss football pyramid.

Meyrin were promoted to 1. Liga in summer 1995. In summer 1996 Meyrin were promoted to Nationalliga B and returned to 1. Liga in the following summer. Meyrin were promoted again in 2003 until relegated again in 2006.

Managers

Current squad
As of 2 November, 2021.

References

External links
 Official site

 
Football clubs in Switzerland
Association football clubs established in 1914
Canton of Geneva
Meyrin
1914 establishments in Switzerland